Roads and expressways in Chicago summarizes the main thoroughfares and the numbering system used in Chicago and its surrounding suburbs.

Street layout
Chicago's streets were laid out in a grid that grew from the city's original townsite plan platted by James Thompson. Streets following the Public Land Survey System section lines later became arterial streets in outlying sections. As new additions to the city were platted, city ordinance required them to be laid out with eight streets to the mile in one direction and 16 in the other direction. A scattering of diagonal streets, many of them originally Native American trails, also cross the city. Many additional diagonal streets were recommended in the Plan of Chicago, but only the extension of Ogden Avenue was ever constructed. In the 1950s and 1960s, a network of superhighways was built radiating from the city center.

As the city grew and annexed adjacent towns, problems arose with duplicate street names and a confusing numbering system based on the Chicago River.  On June 22, 1908, the city council adopted a system proposed by Edward P. Brennan; amended June 21, 1909.  The changes were effective September 1, 1909 for most of the city.

Addresses in Chicago and some suburbs are numbered outward from baselines at State Street, which runs north and south, and Madison Street, which runs east and west.

A book was published in 1909 by The Chicago Directory Company indexing the old and new street numbers for most of Chicago.  This volume is available online in PDF format indexed by initial letter, Plan of Re-Numbering, City of Chicago, August 1909. The opening text of the book says: EXPLANATORY

The downtown area did not conform to this system until April 1, 1911, per an amendment to the law on June 20, 1910.  Downtown was defined as Lake Michigan on the east, Roosevelt Road (Twelfth Street) on the south, and the Chicago River on the north and west.  The addition to cover downtown was published, and is also on line as a pdf indexed by downtown street name.

This additional paragraph explained the downtown changes:

Chicago house numbers are generally assigned at the rate of 800 to a mile. The only exceptions are from Madison to 31st Street, just south of downtown. Roosevelt Road (previously Twelfth St) is one mile south of Madison with 1200 addresses to the mile, Cermak Road (previously 22nd Street) is two miles south of Madison with 1000 addresses to the mile, and 31st Street (3100 S) is three miles south of Madison with 900 addresses to the mile. South of 31st Street, the pattern of 800 to the mile resumes, with 39th Street the next major street, 47th after that, and so on.  Individual house numbers are normally assigned at the rate of one per 20 feet of frontage. Thus the last two digits of house numbers generally go only as high as 67 before the next block number is reached.  Higher house numbers are found on diagonal streets and have sometimes been assigned by request.

The blocks are normally counted out by "hundreds," so that Chicagoans routinely give directions by saying things such as "about twelve hundred north on Western" or "around twenty-four hundred west on Division" (which both describe the intersection of Western Avenue (2400 W) and Division Street (1200 N)).

South of Madison Street most of the east–west streets are simply numbered.  The street numbering is aligned with the house numbering, so that 95th Street is exactly 9500 South. "Half-block" east–west thoroughfares in this area are numbered and called places; 95th Place would lie just south of and parallel to 95th Street, and just north of 96th Street.

Every four blocks (half-mile) is a major secondary street. For example, Division Street (1200 N) is less important than either Chicago Avenue (800 N) or North Avenue (1600 N), but is still a major thoroughfare. However, this is not always the case; for example, on the city's Far North Side, Peterson Avenue (6000 N) is a more heavily trafficked street than Bryn Mawr Avenue (5600 N), which sits exactly at the 7-mile marker. U.S. Route 14 is routed along Peterson between Clark Street at 1600 W and Cicero Avenue at 4800 W, whereas Bryn Mawr is discontinuous, split into two segments in this part of the city by Rosehill Cemetery between Damen and Western Avenues.

Even-numbered addresses are found on the north and west sides of a street, and odd numbers are found on the south and east sides, irrespective of the streets' position relative to the corner of State and Madison.

Diagonals, even if they were to run exactly 45 degrees off of the cardinal directions, are numbered as if they were north–south or east–west streets. Examples are North Lincoln Avenue and Ogden Avenue, which bends at Madison and changes from North Ogden to West Ogden.

The northernmost street in Chicago is Juneway Terrace (7800 N), just north of Howard Street. The southern boundary is 138th Street. The eastern boundary of Chicago is Avenue A/State Line Road (4100 E) along and south of 106th Street, and the furthest west the city extends is in the portion of O'Hare International Airport that lies in DuPage County, just east of Elmhurst/York Road.

Street names

While all north–south streets within city limits are named, rather than numbered, smaller streets in some areas are named in groups all starting with the same letter; thus, when traveling westward on a Chicago street, starting just past Pulaski Road (4000 W), one will cross a mile-long stretch of streets which have names starting with the letter K (From east to west: Keystone (North Side)/Komensky (South Side), Karlov, Kedvale, Keeler, Kildare, Kolin, Kostner, Kenneth, Kilbourn, Kolmar, Kenton, Knox, Kilpatrick, Keating), giving rise to the expression "K-town". These streets are found approximately in the 11th mile west of the Indiana state line, and so begin with the 11th letter of the alphabet. A mile later, just past Cicero (4800 W), the starting letter changes to L, and mile by mile the letters progress up to P. Additionally, for most of the first mile west of the Illinois/Indiana state line, streets are lettered from Avenue A at the state line (4100 E) to Avenue O (3430 E), forming the A group.  The areas that might otherwise be the B through J groups are the older parts of the city where street names were already well established before this system was developed (although some small groups of streets seem to have been given names intended to conform to the system), and the Q group (8800 to 9600 W) would fall west of the city, as the only land in Chicago west of 8800 West is O'Hare International Airport, undeveloped forest preserve, and a small strip of land connecting O'Hare to the rest of the city and containing only Foster Avenue.

Suburbs
Some suburbs number their east–west streets in a continuation of the Chicago pattern, and even more number their houses according to the Chicago grid. A few suburbs also number their north–south avenues according to the Chicago grid, although such numbering vanished from Chicago itself long ago (the alphabetical naming scheme was devised to help eliminate it). For example, the 54th/Cermak terminus of the Pink Line is located near the intersection of 54th Avenue and Cermak Road (22nd Street) in Cicero. This is 54 blocks west of State Street in Chicago. A minor street  blocks west of State Street would be called 54th Court (in reality, that is Lotus Avenue in Chicago).

This pattern continues as far west as Plainfield, which has a 252nd Avenue, as far north as Skokie at Central Street (10100 North), and as far south as the southern edge of Will County.  Suburbs that follow the Chicago numbering system include Niles, Rosemont, Morton Grove, Skokie, Lincolnwood, Franklin Park, River Grove, Evergreen Park, Oak Lawn, Oak Forest, Matteson, Channahon, unincorporated parts of Des Plaines, Glenview, and other parts of Cook County, Will, and DuPage Counties. Other suburbs, including Evanston, Park Ridge, Oak Park, Glenview and Wilmette use their own numbering systems. The six "collar" counties (DuPage, Kane, Kendall, Lake, McHenry, and Will) use State and Madison as a base line. For example, 32W000 in DuPage County is 32 miles west of State Street, 38000 in Lake County would be 38 miles north of Madison Street, and is normally used without the direction letter. In these counties, unlike Chicago, numbering is 1,000 numbers to the mile, so in DuPage County  miles west is 32W500.

Some Chicago suburbs in adjoining Northwest Indiana also use the Chicago numbering system.  These include East Chicago, Whiting, and Hammond. There are even examples further south in Lake County in Dyer and Schererville such as 205th Place through 215th Street (these examples coordinate with the Chicago grid, not the Gary street system). Other municipalities, such as Highland, and Griffith are based on the Gary, Indiana numbering system, beginning with 5th Avenue in Gary and increasing numerically as one travels southward. Examples in Scheider in the far south of Lake County, Indiana go as far down as 244th Avenue.

The aforementioned pattern also occurs in Waukegan, Illinois, with Washington Street being the baseline between north and south. Nearby municipalities such as Gurnee, Park City, and North Chicago continue with the Waukegan numbering pattern, while rural areas in Lake County, Illinois follow the Chicago grid.

Grid

Mile roads

(No part of Golf Road, Dempster Street, Oakton Street, Wolf Road, LaGrange Road or 143rd Street to 231st Street actually lies within the boundaries of Chicago. These streets are included for reference, since they are a continuation of the Chicago mile street pattern into the suburbs.)

Downtown
The density of main streets in downtown Chicago is greater than in the rest of the city, with some at half-block spacing (just 50 address numbers or one-sixteenth mile from the next parallel street), or block spacing between main streets, unlike the rest of the city where the main streets are spaced at half-mile and mile intervals:

 North/south:
 Canal Street (500 W)
 Wacker Drive (400 W)
 Franklin Street (300 W)
 Wells Street (200 W)
 LaSalle Street (150 W)
 Clark Street (100 W)
 Dearborn Street (36 W)
 State Street (0 E/W)
 Wabash Avenue (44 E)
 Michigan Avenue (100 E)
 Columbus Drive (300 E)
 McClurg Court (400 E)
 East/west:
 Oak Street (1000 N)
 Chicago Avenue (800 N)
 Huron Street (700 N)
 Ohio Street (600 N)
 Grand Avenue (530 N)
 Illinois Street (500 N)
 Hubbard Street (430 N)
 Kinzie Street (400 N)
 Wacker Drive (300 N)
 Lake Street (200 N)
 Randolph Street (150 N)
 Washington Street (100 N)
 Madison Street (0 N/S)
 Monroe Street (100 S)
 Adams Street (200 S)
 Jackson Boulevard (300 S)
 Van Buren Street (400 S)
 Ida B. Wells Drive/Congress Parkway (500 S)
 Harrison Street (600 S)
 Polk Street (800 S)

Secondary streets
 East/west:
 10000 N – (Old Orchard Road)
 9200 N – (Church Street)
 8400 N – (Main Street)
 7600 N – Howard Street
 6800 N – Pratt Avenue
 6000 N –  Peterson Avenue
 5200 N – Foster Avenue
 4600 N – Wilson Avenue (not a half-mile)
 4400 N – Montrose Avenue
 3600 N – Addison Street
 2800 N – Diversey Parkway
 2000 N – Armitage Avenue
 1200 N – Division Street
 400 N – Kinzie Street
 1000 S – Taylor Street (not a half-mile)
 1600 S – 16th Street
 2600 S – 26th Street
 3500 S – 35th Street
 4300 S – 43rd Street
 5100 S – 51st Street (East Hyde Park Boulevard)
 5900 S – 59th Street
 6700 S – Marquette Road (67th Street)
 7500 S –  75th Street
 8300 S – 83rd Street (German Church Road in Willow Springs, Montgomery Road in Aurora)
 9100 S – 91st Street
 9900 S – 99th Street
 10700 S –  107th Street
 11500 S –  115th Street
 12300 S – 123rd Street (McCarthy Road in Palos Park)
 13000 S – 130th Street (not a half-mile)

The half-mile numbered streets on the South Side are all secondary streets: 35th, 43rd, 51st, 59th, etc.; all are numbered aside from Marquette Road, running at 6700 S, west from Martin Luther King Jr. Drive (400 E) to the city's western limit at Cicero Avenue (4800 W), near Midway International Airport. East of King to near Lake Michigan at 2400 E, it is called 67th Street, and Marquette is aligned one block to the north on what would be 66th Street.
 North/south:
 9400 W – River Road (not a half-mile)
 8400 W –  1st Avenue (Cumberland Avenue)
 7600 W – Oriole Avenue
 6800 W – Oak Park Avenue
 6000 W – Austin Avenue
 5200 W – Laramie Avenue
 4400 W – Kostner Avenue
 3600 W – Central Park Avenue
 3400 W – Kimball Avenue (Homan Avenue) not a half-mile
 2800 W – California Avenue
 2000 W – Damen Avenue
 1200 W – Racine Avenue
 400 E – Martin Luther King Jr. Drive (King Drive)
 1200 E – Woodlawn Avenue
 2000 E – Jeffery Boulevard
 2628 E – Torrence Avenue (not a half-mile)
 2800 E – Burnham Avenue
 3000 E – Commercial Avenue (not a half-mile)
 3600 E – Avenue L

(No part of Old Orchard Road, Church Street, or Main Street actually lies within the boundaries of Chicago. These streets are included for reference, since they are a continuation of the Chicago mile street pattern into the suburbs.)

A similar numbering system is also used in Milwaukee, Wisconsin.

Diagonal roads
The following streets run diagonally through Chicago's grid system on all or part of their courses. These streets tend to form major 5 or 6-way intersections. In many cases they were Indian trails, or were among the earliest streets established in the city. Diagonals are numbered as north–south or east–west streets. Examples are North Lincoln Avenue and Ogden Avenue, which bends at Madison and changes from North Ogden to West Ogden.
 N. Rogers Avenue
  N. Ridge Avenue/Boulevard
 N. Broadway
 N. Clark Street
 N. Rush Street
  N. Lincoln Avenue
  N. Sheridan Road
  N. Caldwell Avenue
 N. Lehigh Avenue
 N. Clybourn Avenue
 N. Kingsbury Street
 N. Elston Avenue
 N. Avondale Avenue
  N. Milwaukee Avenue
  N. Northwest Highway
 W. Forest Preserve Drive
  W. Higgins Avenue
  W. Grand Avenue
  W. Lake Street
 W. Fifth Avenue
  N. and W. Ogden Avenue
 S. Blue Island Avenue
 S. Canalport Avenue
  S. Archer Avenue
 W. Columbus Avenue
 S. Vincennes Avenue
 S. Beverly Avenue
 S. Anthony Avenue
 S. South Chicago Avenue
 S. Exchange Avenue
 S. Ewing Avenue
  S. South Shore Drive
    S. Indianapolis Avenue

Expressways
The city of Chicago proper contains seven major Interstate highways.

U.S. Routes

County roads
Cook County has a modest amount of county roads after plans were made in 2009 to designate many roads on county ownership as a public service.

Only the designated streets in the townships of Lemont, Palos, Orland, Bremen, Lyons (south of the rivers) and Wheeling have the blue pentagon signs that are used to demarcate county roads.

Gallery

See also
 Chicago Department of Transportation
 Chicago Pedway
 Chicago Tunnel Company
 Cycling in Chicago
 Horatio G. Loomis
 LaSalle Street Tunnel
 Matthew Laflin
 Philip Maxwell
 Philo Carpenter
 Van Buren Street Tunnel
 Washington Street Tunnel (Chicago)

References

External links
 Architecture and Building History resources, Chicago History Museum

Chicago-related lists
 
 
Transportation in Chicago
Chicago